Kacha-ye Chahardeh (also Romanized as Kāchā-ye Chahārdeh; also known as Kāchā, Kachan, Kacheh, Kācheh, Kajjeh, and Kāshā) is a village in Chahardeh Rural District, in the Central District of Astaneh-ye Ashrafiyeh County, Gilan Province, Iran. At the 2006 census, its population was 964, in 329 families.

References 

Populated places in Astaneh-ye Ashrafiyeh County